Zafar Muhammad Lutfar is a National Awami Party (Muzaffar) politician and the former Member of Parliament of Dinajpur-6.

Career
Lutfar was elected to parliament from Dinajpur-6 as a National Awami Party (Muzaffar) candidate in 1986 and 1988.

References

National Awami Party (Muzaffar) politicians
Living people
3rd Jatiya Sangsad members
Year of birth missing (living people)